Wendy Ullman is an American politician. A member of the Democratic Party, she represented the 143rd district in the Pennsylvania House of Representatives from 2019 to 2021. Before assuming office, she was an English professor at Bucks County Community College and Montgomery County Community College.

She introduced HB 1322 in 2019 to implement a 5 cent beverage deposit fee, which would be returned to the consumer upon the return of the bottle. The intent of the legislation is to increase the rates of recycling in Pennsylvania. Unclaimed bottle deposit reimbursements would be forfeited to the state and be put towards the Hazardous Sites Clean-Up fund.

References

External links 
 Official website

Democratic Party members of the Pennsylvania House of Representatives
Women state legislators in Pennsylvania
21st-century American women politicians
1952 births
Living people
21st-century American politicians